and , also called  (collectively known as ) are small or miniature shrines entrusted to the care of a larger shrine, generally due to some deep connection with the enshrined kami.

The two terms used to have legally different meanings, but are today synonyms. Setsumatsusha can lie either  or  the main shrine's premises. Setsumatsusha are usually 1x1 ken in size. They can however be as small as beehives or relatively large and have 1x2, 1x3 or even, in one case, 1x7 bays.

History
The practice of building sessha and massha shrines within a jinja predates written history. The earliest setsumatsusha usually had some strong connection to the history of the area or the family of the enshrined kami.

During the Heian period, Ise Shrine used to make a distinction between the two types based on whether a shrine belonged to the Engishiki Jinmyōchō list (sessha) or to the Enryaku gishikichō list (massha).

When the  shrine ranking system was abolished in 1946, legally the distinction disappeared, but both terms remained in use out of habit.

Architectural style

Being true shrines, setsumatsusha have most features other types of shrines have, including doors and often stairs. It owes its name to the fact that, unlike other shrine styles, it doesn't feature a stairway at its entrance, and the veranda is completely flat. Miniature stairways can however be present. They can be either , that is have the entrance under the gable, or, more frequently, that is, have the entrance on the side parallel to the roof's ridge (see examples in the gallery). Apart from the lack of a staircase, such shrines belong to the nagare-zukuri or kasuga-zukuri styles.

Architectural examples

Notes

References

Shinto shrines
Shinto architecture
Japanese words and phrases